Julie Brochorst Andersen (born 27 May 1993) is a Danish actress. Her acting career began when, as a 15-year-old, she participated in a casting at school and went on to star in the teenage drama Hold me Tight.

Filmography
 Mens Vi Lever (English: While We Live, 2017) 
 Anti (2016) 
 Hundeliv (English: Where Have All the Good Men Gone, 2016)
 Shiva  (Short Film, 2015)
 Voxeværk  (Short Film, 2015)
 Lækre til vi dør (Short Film, 2013)
 Mommy (Short Film, 2013)
 Ambulo (Short Film, 2012)
 You & Me Forever (2012)
 Hold om mig (English: Hold Me Tight, 2010)

Television appearances
 Badehotellet (Bath Hotel, 2019)
 Perfekte Steder (Perfect Places, 2016–2017)
 Alfa (Grow, 2020)

Awards and nominations
 Best Actress, CPH Web Fest 2018 (Vitasminde, Winner)
 Best Actress, Ole 2013 (You & Me Forever, Winner)
 Best Actress, Bodil Award 2013 (You & Me Forever, Nominee)
 Best Actress, Zulu Awards 2011 (Hold om mig, Nominee)
 Best Actress, Robert Award 2011 (Hold om mig, Nominee)
 Best Actress, Bodil Award 2011 (Hold om mig'', Nominee)

References

External links

Julie Brochorst Andersen on Team Players

Actresses from Copenhagen
21st-century Danish actresses
1993 births
Living people
Danish film actresses
Danish television actresses
University of Copenhagen alumni